The Yidiny (also spelt Yidindj, Yidinji or Yidiñ), are an Aboriginal Australian people in Far North Queensland. Their language is the Yidiny language.

Language

The last fluent speakers of Yidiny were Tilly Fuller (d. October 1974), George Davis (b.1919), Dick Moses (b.1898) and his sister Ida Burnett of White Rock. A substantial part of the language has been analysed and recorded by Robert M. W. Dixon.

Country
The Yidiny lands were in lowland rainforest areas, stretching from Yarrabah down to the south, where their borders met those of the Ngajanji and the Wanyurr. To their north were the coastal Djabugay people. These included the areas of Deeral north to Gordonvale and Cairns. Their inland extension ran as far as Lake Barrine. Their eastern boundary was on the crest of the Prior Range.

Today, there are four traditional owner groups representing the peoples of the Cairns region. One of these groups represents the Yidinji clans, and comprises Gimuy Walubara Yidinji, Dulabed Malanbarra and Yidinji, Mandingalbay Yidinji and Wadjanbarra Tableland Yidinji.

History of contact

Colonisation
The Yidiny, along with many other tribal people in the tropical rainforest areas from Cairns to Ingham, and the Atherton Tableland were cleared off their land to enable the establishment of cattle stations and sugar cane plantations. Jack Kane participated in some massacres as a youth and recalled, in 1938 one episode alone in 1884, during a week-long campaign to round up the tribes, Queensland police and native troopers, encircled a Yidiny camp at what became known as Skull Pocket, several miles north of Yungaburra. At dawn, a shot was fired from one side into the camp to make them scatter, and then as they rushed into the ambushing forces elsewhere, were shot down. The native police then stabbed or smashed the brains of the children. One group of the Yidiny, broke off from the rest of the tribe in the early period of settlement, and after shifting to the area of the present-day Redlynch asserted a distinctive identity by calling themselves the Djumbandji. This segment took over a part of Buluwai territory.

Starting around 1910, even those who remained in the area of white settlement were the object of a Queensland Government policy of shifting them into the Anglican mission at Yarrabah on the Cape Grafton peninsula. As each tribe was weakened by dispersal and fragmentation, the elders formed a counter-plan in the 1920s to organise themselves into a more viable political unit, in the shape of a macro-tribe, but the merger failed to take hold, given the notable linguistic differences between groups.

Sovereignty

In 2014, 40 members of the Yidiny people, led by Murrumu Walubara Yidindji (formerly Jeremy Geia)  renounced legal ties with Australia to form the Sovereign Yidindji Government, claiming sovereignty over the lands from south of Port Douglas to Cairns and the Atherton Tablelands.

Social organisation
The Yidiny were composed of several Clans, with Norman Tindale (1974) reporting five:
 Gimuy
 Walubara
 Maiara
 Maimbi
 Djumbandji

Newer sources list eight:
 Gimuy-walubarra Yidi (the traditional custodians of the area around and including the city of Cairns; Gimuy is the traditional name of the area)
 Wadjanbarra Yidi
 Bundabarra Yidi
 Gulgibarra Yidi
 Wujnur/Bindabarra Yidi
 Mandigalpi Yidi
 Badjabarra Yidi
 Mallanbarra Yidi

Alternative names

 Bolambi (from the personal name of one of the tribe's former alpha males)
 Charroogin
 Djumbandji
 Idi (abbreviated autonym)
 Idin
 Idinji
 Itti
 Jumbandjie
 Maiara
 Maimbi
 Mulgrave River dialect (Archibald Meston)
 Myarah
 Yellingie
 Yettingie
 Yidin
 Yidindji, Yidindyi

Notes

Citations

Sources

Aboriginal peoples of Queensland